Ruth Reichl (born 1948), is an American chef, food writer and editor. In addition to two decades as a food critic, mainly spent at the Los Angeles Times and The New York Times, Reichl has also written cookbooks, memoirs and a novel, and been co-producer of PBS's Gourmet's Diary of a Foodie, culinary editor for the Modern Library, host of PBS's Gourmet's Adventures With Ruth, and editor-in-chief of Gourmet magazine. She has won six James Beard Foundation Awards.

Reichl's memoirs are Tender at the Bone: Growing Up at the Table (1998), Comfort Me with Apples: More Adventures at the Table, Garlic and Sapphires: The Secret Life of a Critic in Disguise, Not Becoming My Mother and Save Me the Plums: My Gourmet Memoir (2019). In 2009, she published Gourmet Today a 1,008 page cookbook containing over 1,000 recipes. She published her first novel, Delicious! in 2014, and, in 2015, published My Kitchen Year: 136 Recipes That Saved My Life, a memoir of recipes prepared in the year following the shuttering of Gourmet.

Early life and education
Born in 1948 to Ernst, a typographer, and Miriam (née Brudno), her German-Jewish refugee father and American-Jewish mother, Reichl was raised in Greenwich Village and spent time at a boarding school in Montreal as a young girl. She attended the University of Michigan, where she earned a degree in sociology in 1968 and met her first husband, the artist Douglas Hollis. In 1970 she earned an M.A. in art history, also from the University of Michigan.

Career
Reichl and Hollis moved to Berkeley, California, where her interest in food led to her joining the collectively owned Swallow Restaurant as a chef and co-owner from 1973 to 1977. Reichl began her food-writing career with Mmmmm: A Feastiary, a cookbook, in 1972. She moved on to become food writer and editor of New West magazine in 1978, then to the Los Angeles Times as its restaurant editor from 1984 to 1993 and food editor and critic from 1990 to 1993. She returned to her native New York City in 1993 to become the restaurant critic for The New York Times. In 1999 she left the Times to assume the editorship of Gourmet, which she managed until it closed in 2009. During her tenure, the magazine sold 988,000 copies per month (as of March 2007) and commissioned works like David Foster Wallace's “Consider the Lobster”.

She was known for her ability to "make or break" a restaurant with her attention to detail. For Reichl, her mission was to "demystify the world of fine cuisine" (CBS News Online).

Despite her success and tales of how she used to disguise herself to mask her identity while reviewing, she was quite open about why she stopped: "I really wanted to go home and cook for my family. I don't think there's one thing more important you can do for your kids than have family dinner."  

She was the recipient of six James Beard Awards.

From 2011 to 2013, Reichl appeared as a judge on seasons 3, 4 and 5 of the Bravo reality television show Top Chef Masters.

In 2021, Reichl joined Substack to begin publishing a newsletter about food writing.

Personal life
Reichl is married to Michael Singer, with whom she has one son. They live in Spencertown, New York.

Books
Mmmmm: A Feastiary (cookbook), (1972)
Tender at the Bone: Growing Up at the Table (memoir) (1998)
Comfort Me with Apples: More Adventures at the Table (memoir) (2001)
Garlic and Sapphires: The Secret Life of a Critic in Disguise (memoir) (2005)
The Gourmet Cookbook: More Than 1000 Recipes (2006)
Not Becoming My Mother: and Other Things She Taught Me Along the Way (2009)
Gourmet Today: More than 1000 All-New Recipes for the Contemporary Kitchen (2009)
For You, Mom. Finally. (2010; first published under the title Not Becoming My Mother)
Delicious! (novel) (2014)
My Kitchen Year: 136 Recipes That Saved My Life (2015)
Save Me the Plums: My Gourmet Memoir (2019)

References

External links 

An eG Spotlight Conversation with Ruth Reichl (November 2005)
Salon interview (November 1996) 
CBS Article and interview - May 18, 2005 - "Garlic and Sapphires"
ReviewsOfBooks.com - "Garlic and Sapphires" 

1948 births
Living people
American food writers
American magazine editors
American people of German-Jewish descent
American restaurant critics
American women critics
Women food writers
Women cookbook writers
Los Angeles Times people
Critics employed by The New York Times
University of Michigan College of Literature, Science, and the Arts alumni
Writers from Berkeley, California
Writers from Los Angeles
Writers from Manhattan
20th-century American non-fiction writers
21st-century American non-fiction writers
20th-century American women writers
21st-century American women writers
James Beard Foundation Award winners
Women magazine editors
People from Greenwich Village